Hwang Yao-han (born 30 March 1969) is a Taiwanese taekwondo practitioner. He competed in the men's finweight at the 1988 Summer Olympics.

References

External links
 

1969 births
Place of birth unknown
Living people
Taiwanese male taekwondo practitioners
Olympic taekwondo practitioners of Taiwan
Taekwondo practitioners at the 1988 Summer Olympics
20th-century Taiwanese people